Ischnosiphon is a genus of plants native to Central America, South America, Trinidad and the Lesser Antilles. It was first described as a genus in 1859.

 species

References

Marantaceae
Zingiberales genera
Taxa named by Friedrich August Körnicke